Caro diario is a 1993 Italian-French semi-autobiographical comedy film written, directed and co-produced by Nanni Moretti, who also stars as himself. The film is structured in three anthological episodes, presented as the chapters of Moretti's open diary, in which he describes his thoughts about various slice of life situations.

The film was selected to compete for the Palme d'Or at the 1994 Cannes Film Festival, where Moretti won the Best Director Award.

Plot

Chapter I: In Vespa (On My Vespa) 
Putting the hot Roman summer to good use, Nanni Moretti dedicates himself to his favorite hobby, riding his Vespa through the streets of the half-deserted city.
 
Here, Moretti lets the landscape inspire his thoughts: he laments the banalization of politics in contemporary Italian cinema, comments on the gentrification of the quarters of Rome, mocks the overzealous critical reception of movies like Henry: Portrait of a Serial Killer, and confesses his love for dance caused by the movie Flashdance –later meeting its star Jennifer Beals. Finally, he visits the place in Ostia where Pier Paolo Pasolini was killed, to pay his respects.

Chapter II: Isole (Islands) 
Having to work on an idea for a new movie, Moretti decides to leave Rome for a while for the more peaceful Aeolian Islands. In Lipari he's the guest of his friend Gerardo, an austere scholar who moved there eleven years earlier to better study James Joyce's Ulysses without being distracted by modern commodities such as television, which he despises. However, both are unable to find the tranquility they're searching for since the number of tourists has suddenly increased.

They move to Salina, where they are guests of two couples friends of Gerardo, both incapable of managing their hyperactive children, a feature that seems rampant on the entire island. Meanwhile, Gerardo begins watching television and gradually becomes completely addicted to it, and especially to soap operas. They move again, this time to Stromboli, where they are constantly bothered by a megalomaniac mayor who tries to involve them in the oddest projects.

They finally move to Alicudi, frugal and isolated, lacking water and electricity. Here Moretti seems to have found the right place to focus on his project, but soon Gerardo runs away in despair to catch the last ferry, unable to live without his favorite soap operas, while disavowing his ideals and proclaiming undying love for cheap entertainment.

Chapter III: Medici (Doctors) 
Moretti clarifies to the audience that the following chapter will be based on a true story happened to him some years earlier; one day, he begins to suffer from persistent itching and insomnia. He visits many doctors and specialists, but they all dismiss him with different diagnosis, prescribing to him a lot of costly drugs and prohibiting him to eat most of his favorite food. Seeing no improvements, Moretti unsuccessfully tries alternative cures like reflexology and acupuncture.

After almost a year, a doctor notices his developing cough during a visit and suggests him an X-ray. That reveals a mass on his lung, which after a biopsy is discovered to be a still-curable Hodgkin's lymphoma. Moretti successfully goes through chemotherapy and has the lymphoma cured. Sometime later, he reads the definition of Hodgkin's lymphoma in a basic medical encyclopedia, finding out that its most common symptoms are exactly itching and insomnia. Surrounded by the dozens of useless drugs he bought, Moretti laments the incapability of most doctors of listening to their patients, before making a bitter toast "to health" with a glass of water.

Cast 
Source:
 Chapter I (In Vespa)

 Chapter II (Isole)

 Chapter III (Medici)

Reception
The film grossed L8.3 billion in Italy It also grossed $3.1 million in France.

Year-end lists 
 9th – Janet Maslin, The New York Times
 Honorable mention – David Elliott, The San Diego Union-Tribune
 Honorable mention – Jeff Simon, The Buffalo News

Accolades

See also 
 List of Italian films of 1993

References

External links
 
 Maslin, Janet. "One Worldview, Many Lively Vantage Points," The New York Times, Monday, September 26, 1994.
 Howe, Desson. "Caro Diario (movie review)," Washington Post, Friday, October 21, 1994.
 Shaked, Guy. "An analysis of Nanni Moretti's Caro Diario (Dear Diary)," geocities.com.

1993 comedy films
1993 films
French comedy films
Films directed by Nanni Moretti
Films set in Rome
Films set in Sicily
Films set on islands
Italian comedy films
1990s Italian-language films
Self-reflexive films
Slice of life films
Films about cancer
Films about film directors and producers
Fictional diaries
European Film Awards winners (films)
Films scored by Nicola Piovani
1990s French films